"Maniac 2000" is a song by Mark McCabe featuring vocals performed Shelley Bukspan. It is a medley of Michael Sembello's 1983 song "Maniac" and a rap written mainly by Dublin's Al Gibbs and Mark McCabe, over the largely instrumental Sound Crowd club version of Irish rave act 4-Rhythm's cover of "Maniac", dating back to 1995, which was an Irish top 30 hit for Red Records.

The song was released in Ireland in February 2000 and reached number one on the Irish Singles Chart, staying at that position for ten weeks, from 4 March to 6 May. It was Ireland's best-selling single of 2000 and is the fifth best-selling single in the history of the chart. "Maniac 2000" has achieved cult status in Ireland. The song won best single at the national Meteor Music Awards in 2001. Despite the success the song experienced, it was not a hit in other countries, stalling at number 137 on the UK Singles Chart in late March. In 2015, on the 15th anniversary of its release, Maniac 2000 re-entered the Irish Singles Chart at number 12.

Background
McCabe was a DJ working at Dublin pirate radio station Pulse FM. As part of his sets, he would rap over the instrumental Sound Crowd club version of Irish rave act 4-Rhythm's cover of "Maniac", which led to demands that he record his version. McCabe was told by a local record shop owner that customers would come in each day requesting a copy of the song. McCabe recorded the song in the Clontarf Cricket Club in front of a live audience.

Charts

Weekly charts

Year-end charts

All-time charts

References

External links
 The real story behind Maniac 2000
 (archive link)

1999 songs
2000 singles
Irish novelty songs
Irish Singles Chart number-one singles